US Post Office-Geneva may refer to:
United States Post Office (Geneva, Nebraska), listed on the NRHP in Nebraska
United States Post Office (Geneva, New York), listed on the NRHP in New York